The Triumph Trophy is a touring motorcycle produced by Triumph Motorcycles Ltd from 2012 to 2017.

The motorcycle features a  liquid-cooled, 12-valve, straight-three engine,
which is mated to a six-speed gearbox and shaft drive. The engine is also used on its dual-sport sibling, the Tiger Explorer,
although on the Trophy it produces slightly less power and has a taller sixth gear, more suitable for the touring proposal of this motorcycle.
The base model will be complemented by the SE, which features extra equipment such as electronically adjustable suspension, a Bluetooth audio system, and a tyre-pressure monitoring system. The SE will be the only model sold in the United States, Canada, Australia and Brazil.

References

External links
Trophy page on Triumph Motorcycles

Trophy 
Touring motorcycles
Motorcycles introduced in 2012
Shaft drive motorcycles